Gandra may refer to:

 Gandra (Esposende), a freguesia (parish) in the concelho (municipality) of Esposende, Portugal
 Gandra (Paredes), a parish in the municipality of Paredes, Portugal
 Gandra, a parish in the municipality of Ponte de Lima, Portugal
 Gandra e Taião, a parish in the municipality of Valença, Portugal
 Gandra, Póvoa de Varzim, a hamlet located in the parish of Balazar, Póvoa de Varzim

See also
Gândara, neighborhood of Póvoa de Varzim, Portugal